Idiognathoides is an extinct genus of conodonts.

Glen K. Merrill stated in 1963 that "conodont workers have considered Idiognathoides to be a junior synonym of Polygnathodella but it now proves to be a junior synonym of Cavusgnathus. Polygnathodella and Cavusgnathus are shown to form a transitional series."

Use in stratigraphy 
The Bashkirian, the oldest age of the Pennsylvanian (also known as Upper Carboniferous), contains six biozones based on conodont index fossils, one of which contains an Idiognathoides species : the zone of Idiognathoides sinuatus.

The base of the Moscovian, the second stage in the Pennsylvanian, is close to the first appearances of the conodonts Declinognathodus donetzianus and Idiognathoides postsulcatus. The GSSP candidate sections are the Ural mountains or in Nashui, Luodian County, Guizhou, China.

References 

 Considerations of the Idiognathoides - Declinognathodus - Neognathodus complex of Middle Carboniferous platform conodonts. David L. Dunn, Lethaia, January 1971,  volume 4, issue 1, pages 15–19,

External links 
 
 

Conodont genera
Pennsylvanian conodonts
Fossil taxa described in 1933